Trzepowo  is a village in the administrative district of Gmina Przywidz, within Gdańsk County, Pomeranian Voivodeship, in northern Poland. It is located within the historic region of Pomerania.

The village has a population of 295.

The settlement Łąki is part of the village.

Trzepowo was a royal village of the Polish Crown, administratively located in the Tczew County in the Pomeranian Voivodeship.

References

Trzepowo